SMJ may refer to:
 Singapore Medical Journal
 Southern Medical Journal
 SM Entertainment Japan
 Lule Sami language (ISO 639-2 language code)